The Philippines competed at the 1948 Summer Olympics in Wembley Park, London, England. 26 competitors, all men, took part in 18 events in 8 sports.

Athletics

Men
Track & road events

Boxing

Basketball

Preliminary round (group B)
 Defeated Iraq (102-30)
 Defeated South Korea (35-33)
 Lost to Chile (39-68)
 Defeated China (51-32)
 Lost to Belgium (35-37)
Classification 9-16
 Defeated Argentina (45-43)
Classification 9-12
 Lost to Peru (29-40)
Classification 11/12
  Lost to Belgium (34-38) → did not advance, 12th place

Team roster
Manuel Araneta
Ramon Campos Jr.
Eduardo Decena
Andres dela Cruz
Felicisimo "Fely" Fajardo (c)
Gabriel "Gabby" Fajardo
Edgardo "Eduardo" Fulgencio
Primitivo Martinez
Lauro Mumar
Francisco Vestil
Head coach: Dionisio "Chito" Calvo

Shooting

Three shooters represented the Philippines in 1948.

25 metre pistol
 Martin Gison

50 metre pistol
 Martin Gison
 Albert von Einsiedel

50 metre rifle
 Martin Gison
 Albert von Einsiedel
 César Jayme

Swimming

Men's 400m Freestyle
 Sambiao Basanung

Men's 1500m Freestyle
 Sambiao Basanung

Men's 200m Breaststroke
 René Amabuyok
 Jacinto Cayco

Weightlifting

Wrestling

Men's Bantamweight
 Francisco Vicera

References

External links
Philippine Sports Commission
Official Olympic Reports

Nations at the 1948 Summer Olympics
1948 Summer Olympics
Summer Olympics